Bio-Dome is a 1996 American stoner comedy film directed by Jason Bloom. It was produced by Motion Picture Corporation of America on a budget of $8.5 million and was distributed theatrically by Metro-Goldwyn-Mayer.

The plot of the film revolves around two clumsy, dim-witted slackers who, while on a road trip, look for a toilet in what they believe is a shopping mall. The shopping mall turns out to be a "bio-dome", a form of closed ecological system, in which five scientists are about to be hermetically sealed for a year. The film has themes of environmentalism, combined with drug use, sexual innuendo, and toilet humor.

The film stars Stephen Baldwin and Pauly Shore, and has cameo appearances by celebrities such as Roger Clinton and Patricia Hearst. Jack Black and Kyle Gass first came to global attention in Bio-Dome, performing together as Tenacious D on-screen for the first time.

The film grossed $13 million at the box office in North America. Bio-Dome was panned by critics, gaining a record low score of 1/100 on Metacritic. It is often considered to be one of the worst films ever made.

On December 18, 2013, Stephen Baldwin appeared on Mancow Muller's radio/TV show, confirming he was in talks with Pauly Shore about making a sequel to the film revolving around the children of Bud and Doyle, their characters.

Plot
Best friends Bud "Squirrel" Macintosh and Doyle "Stubs" Johnson live together in Arizona, but their environmentalist girlfriends, Jen and Monique, dump them due to their immaturity. Driving back home, they pass by the Bio-Dome, where scientist Dr. Noah Faulkner is about to seal his team in for a year without outside contact. Mistaking the Bio-Dome for a mall, Bud and Doyle go inside to use the bathroom, only to be sealed in along with the scientists. Dr. Leaky, the project's investor, discovers them and demands their removal, but Dr. Faulkner refuses, claiming it would destroy the purpose of the experiment, so Bud and Doyle remain. Although things initially go smoothly, this proves to be a mistake, as Bud and Doyle continue their antics, harming themselves and destroying many of the scientists' projects. The scientists plead to Dr. Faulkner, but he only relents after the two find a secret stash of junk food and experiment with laughing gas. The two are then banished to the desert environment section, and after three days of isolation, they discover a key in the lock of one of the windows, which opens a back door, and they escape the Bio-Dome.

As Bud and Doyle are receiving a pizza delivery at the dome, they learn Jen and Monique are attending an environmental party with other men, so decide to outdo the party and hold one inside the Bio-Dome to win them back. The party backfires, as it throws the experiment into chaos and Jen and Monique disavow the boys. The scientists prepare to exit out of the desert through the door, but realizing their idiotic actions, Bud and Doyle intervene and demand they all stay and restore the dome to full health, arguing that the real world itself is currently not a pristine environment, with Doyle swallowing the key as a last resort. The group subdues the situation and begins to fix the dome together, while the boys and the scientists bond with each other as a team, and Bud and Doyle's efforts in restoring the dome soon draw a large group of fans and supporters, including Monique and Jen. Meanwhile, Dr. Faulkner, who had disappeared the night of the party, has gone insane and is starting plans to blow up the dome with IEDs inside of coconuts.

After several months pass and Earth Day approaches, Bud, Doyle, and the team successfully restore the dome, but on the night before the doors reopen, Bud and Doyle discover Dr. Faulkner, hoping to apologize to him and make amends. He tells the two that he is rigging pyrotechnics for the door-opening ceremony and gets them to help plant the items, unaware they are really bombs. Once Bud and Doyle are left alone with the bombs, they goof off with one of the coconuts, and after a failed long pass, they discover their dangerous nature. They alert the others and try to exit the dome early, but the door cannot be opened until the clock hits zero, when the bombs will detonate. Bud and Doyle run back into the dome to find Dr. Faulkner and get him to deactivate the bombs. After a chase and struggle, they knock him out and use a remote to disable the coconuts.

With the Bio-Dome experiment complete, the team gets ready to exit the now-open door, but as they begin to walk out, Dr. Faulkner returns with one last coconut bomb, trips, and the bomb detonates at the entrance.  Bud, Doyle, Jen, and Monique bid farewell to the Bio-Dome scientists and drive off, where Doyle yet again has to use the bathroom and the car is seen driving toward a mysterious nuclear power plant. Dr. Faulkner, meanwhile, has escaped the dome through the desert window door, having retrieved the key Doyle swallowed, and flees through the desert pursued by police.

Cast

Production
The film was financed by a loan from Coutts & Co. to the Motion Picture Corporation of America

Release
Bio-Dome grossed $13.4 million in North America, against an estimated production budget of $8.5 million. MGM spent $10 million on marketing.

Reception 
On Rotten Tomatoes, the film has an approval rating of 4% based on reviews from 26 critics. The critical consensus reads: "Like its two obnoxious protagonists, this dreadfully unfunny Pauly Shore vehicle should remain separated from society." On Metacritic, it has a score of 1 out of 100 based on reviews from 10 critics, indicating "overwhelming dislike". It is one of eleven films to hold this rating; the other 10 being 10 Rules for Sleeping Around, Chaos, inAPPropriate Comedy, Not Cool, The Singing Forest, The Garbage Pail Kids Movie, Death of a Nation, Hardbodies, Mother's Day and United Passions. Audiences surveyed by CinemaScore gave the film a grade B− on scale of A to F.

Leondard Klady of Variety wrote: "It's not by any means inspired madness. Neither the script nor direction lives up to the concept, and the picture evolves into a 'Bio'-degradable hash rather than a zany sendup of potent issues and serious intents gone awry." Owen Gleiberman of Entertainment Weekly gave the film a grade F, saying "Even with the low expectations any reasonable viewer brings to a Shore flick, this rates only stupid-plus." Stephen Holden of The New York Times called it "inept in almost every respect." Travis Clark of Business Insider deemed it the "3rd worst movie of all time" according to critical and audience reactions.

Accolades

At the 1996 Golden Raspberry Awards, Shore co-won a Razzie Award for Worst Actor for his work in the film, tied with Tom Arnold for that actor's performances in Big Bully, Carpool, and The Stupids. At the 1996 Stinkers Bad Movie Awards, the movie won two of the movies' three nominations: Worst On-Screen Hairstyle for Stephen Baldwin and Most Painfully Unfunny Comedy. Shore was also nominated for Worst Actor, but lost it to Tom Arnold for his acting in the same three movies.

Potential sequel
On December 18, 2013, Stephen Baldwin appeared on Mancow Muller's radio/TV show, confirming that he is in talks with Pauly Shore about making a sequel to the film revolving around the children of their characters Bud and Doyle. Baldwin had also stated that he gets recognized more for his role in Bio-Dome than any other film he has done thus far. In an interview published in Variety on January 17, 2017, he reiterated his desire to make a sequel, saying that Shore was interested and he has funding, but is seeking studio approval.

See also
 Biosphere 2
 List of American films of 1996
 List of films considered the worst
 MARS-500
 Montreal Biodome

References

External links

 
 
 
 

1996 films
1990s buddy comedy films
American buddy comedy films
American slapstick comedy films
Psychological comedy films
1990s English-language films
Films directed by Jason Bloom
Environmental films
American films about cannabis
Metro-Goldwyn-Mayer films
Stoner films
1996 directorial debut films
1996 comedy films
Golden Raspberry Award winning films
1990s American films